Gerald Austin McHugh Jr. (born November 16, 1954) is a United States district judge of the United States District Court for the Eastern District of Pennsylvania.

Biography

McHugh was born and raised in West Philadelphia. McHugh received an Artium Baccalaureus degree, summa cum laude, in 1976 from St. Joseph's University. He received a Juris Doctor, cum laude, in 1979 from the University of Pennsylvania Law School. In 1979, he served as a law clerk to Judge Edmund B. Spaeth of the Pennsylvania Superior Court. From 1979 to 1981, he served as a law clerk to Judge Alfred L. Luongo of the United States District Court for the Eastern District of Pennsylvania. From 1981 to 2004, he was a shareholder at the civil litigation law firm of Litvin, Blumberg, Matusow and Young. From 2004 to 2014, he was a partner at the Philadelphia law firm of Raynes McCarty, where he handled complex civil litigation involving tort, insurance and civil rights claims.

Federal judicial service

On August 1, 2013, President Barack Obama nominated McHugh to serve as a United States District Judge of the United States District Court for the Eastern District of Pennsylvania, to the seat vacated by Judge Harvey Bartle III, who assumed senior status on October 1, 2011. On January 16, 2014 his nomination was reported out of committee by a 12–5 vote. On Thursday March 13, 2014 Senate Majority Leader Harry Reid filed a motion to invoke cloture on the nomination.  On March 26, 2014, the United States Senate invoked cloture on his  nomination by a 56–43 vote.  He was later confirmed that same day by a 59–41 vote. He received his judicial commission on March 28, 2014.

References

External links

1954 births
Living people
Judges of the United States District Court for the Eastern District of Pennsylvania
Pennsylvania lawyers
St. Joseph's Preparatory School alumni
Saint Joseph's University alumni
University of Pennsylvania Law School alumni
United States district court judges appointed by Barack Obama
21st-century American judges